Kevin Sydney is a fictional character appearing in American comic books published by Marvel Comics. Created by writer Roy Thomas and artist Werner Roth, the character first appeared in The X-Men #35 (Aug. 1967).

Sydney first appeared as Changeling, a mutant shapeshifter. He was a short-lived adversary for the X-Men who subsequently joined Professor X and died shortly after, making him the first member of the X-Men to die in action. The character was reintroduced as Morph in the 1990s for X-Men: The Animated Series. An alternate reality version of the character under the codename Morph reappeared in the comics as part of the Exiles in 2001.

Publication history
The first run of appearances occurred in 1967–1968 when he appeared in The X-Men #37-42 as Changeling. Although dying at the end of this run, he was thought to have been seen as a ghost in Excalibur: The Possession (1991) and returned as a zombie in The Sensational She-Hulk #34-35 (1991–1992).

The character was later reintroduced as an easygoing comic-relief character for X-Men: The Animated Series. According to showrunner Eric Lewald's behind-the-scenes book, Previously On X-Men: The Making of an Animated Series, the creators had intended for Thunderbird to be the series' early sacrifice, but they became uncomfortable with the idea of killing off a Native American character. Scanning the X-books for a substitute, the character Changeling was found and repurposed for the series. Sydney's codename was changed to Morph because DC Comics owned the trademark to "Changeling" when the series debuted.

Morph's first comic book appearance was 1992's X-Men Adventures #1, which adapted the "Night of the Sentinels" TV pilot. Then in 1995, inspired by the character in the animated series, a new Morph was featured in the "Age of Apocalypse" crossover event, debuting in the one-shot comic X-Men Alpha. The character underwent a drastic change in appearance for this event, appearing white-skinned and hairless. Then in 2001, Marvel introduced an alternate-reality version of this Morph, from Earth-1081. He first appeared in Exiles #1.

Fictional character biography

Earth-616 character
Kevin Sydney, known as "Changeling", originally worked for the villainous organization Factor Three. He acted as the Mutant Master's second-in-command in an effort to trigger World War III. After successfully capturing the heroic X-Men, the Mutant Master is exposed as an extraterrestrial and goes out of control. The mutants of Factor Three ultimately joined with the X-Men to defeat the Mutant Master.

Following that group's defeat, Changeling sought to reform. He divulged to Professor X that he was suffering from an unspecified terminal illness with only a few months left to live and wished to atone for his misdeeds. Professor X recruited Changeling to act as a stand-in, unbeknownst to the X-Men, while the Professor isolated himself to prepare a defense against the alien Z'Nox's invasion. Changeling, masquerading as Professor X, led the X-Men's efforts to defeat the Subterranean Grotesk. He was mortally wounded in battle with Grotesk by the explosion of an oscillotron machine and, consequently, died preventing the destruction of Earth. The X-Men mourned the loss of Professor X until it was later revealed that it was, in fact, Changeling.

When the mystical Darkhold was recreated, Changeling's spirit used the opportunity to possess Meggan. Angry that he used his remaining time helping the X-Men instead of seeking a cure for himself, Changeling sought revenge against Professor X. However, Merlyn later admits that the encounter was merely fantasy, having orchestrated the event to prepare Excalibur.

Changeling is later raised from the dead as a zombie by Black Talon to form part of the team X-Humed (which also consisted of Harry Leland, Living Diamond, and Scaleface), and used to attack She-Hulk. He is able to break Talon's control of him long enough to allow She-Hulk to win and lay the zombies back to rest.

Earth-1081 character
Morph is a hero from Earth-1081 who was a member of the New Mutants, X-Men, and Avengers. He was a unique son of loving parents. Early on in life he managed to use his powers, and was able to give everyone what they wanted from him. Morph always used his power to joke around and keep everyone at ease with him, only comfortable to be himself around his parents.

His mother died of lung cancer and Morph tried in every way to cheer up his emotionally distraught father (often acting in a childish way whenever his father wanted him to act serious), who, unable to let his suffering go, chose to enroll his son in a boarding school; luckily, that school happened to be the Xavier Institute for Higher Learning.

Promoted to the X-Men, Morph's sense of humor initially grated upon the much more serious team but eventually his humor and humility won them over. He was instrumental in many of the team's victories and was chosen to be part of a pilot program with the Avengers, along with the Beast, as a public representative of mutant-kind.

Morph would return to the X-Men because, in his own words, "he missed his freaky mutant brothers and sisters." On a subsequent mission, Morph and the rest of the X-Men were facing off against a threat known only as Stonehenge when Morph became unhinged from time.

The Exiles
After becoming unhinged from time, the mysterious Timebroker appeared to him, explaining that his unhinging was the result of a chain of events that caused his reality to change. In that new reality a wounded Morph is unable to maintain his form, and is in a coma, being only a white muddy substance in Beast's lab. Hoping to save his own future, he becomes a member, and comic relief, of the Exiles, a group of universe-hopping heroes trying to save realities from ripples and alteration. Morph is a founding member of the Exiles and he is the only original member remaining throughout the series.

He soon befriended the mutant Sunfire, and her death left him emotionally wrecked.

Mojo's World
The Exiles battled on, fixing reality after reality and struggling to keep it together. Following one of these missions the team was kidnapped by Mojo, the insane evil dictator of the Mojoverse. Mojo considered Morph the best entertainer he had ever seen and brought him back to entertain the masses. If he didn't, Mojo would kill his fellow Exile, Nocturne. Eventually, Nocturne was able to escape and set Morph free. Mojo went crazy and threatened to kill Morph's friends. An enraged Morph was on the verge of killing Mojo when the Timebroker stopped them. The Timebroker revealed Mojo had disrupted time but he was a necessary evil and could not be killed.

Weapon X
Morph continued to be the heart of the team until a mission in which Mimic was taken over by a Brood egg. During the battle, he killed Sunfire. Mimic was eventually cured but Morph was enraged. He was devastated by Sunfire's death and told Mimic he should have killed himself rather than let something like this happen. Morph stormed off and threatened to leave the team. Magik, an unlikely ally, followed and tried to calm him. The two connected and despite her past attitude during missions, Morph realized Illyana was just a scared girl trying to get home. He remained angry with Mimic but helped his team fight against the rogue reality-hopping team, Weapon X.

Before the battle began, Magik attempted to switch sides, believing her team was weaker. Hyperion, the self-appointed leader of Weapon X, snapped her neck and Morph was driven into a rage. He attacked Hyperion, who attempted to blast Morph with his eyebeams, but Mimic saved him. During the brawl with Weapon X, Morph fought against an evil Ms. Marvel. Their battle caused a building to fall in on them, killing Ms. Marvel but Morph was able to survive.

The Exiles were triumphant and the Timebroker told Morph he could finally go home. His mission was fulfilled. Morph considered the offer but asked if he could stay with his team. He realized they needed him and he could not leave them behind. The Timebroker agreed; Morph asked him not to tell the rest of the Exiles of his decision. Morph and Mimic reconciled since he realized that Sunfire's death was not Mimic's fault and that the Brood was controlling him. The team moved on.

Proteus
Morph helped the team take down Proteus by impersonating the Maestro and weakening Proteus with a steel strip in his head. Morph went to take down Proteus but Proteus knocked the steel plate out of his head and took over Morph's body in issue #80. When the Exiles tracked him to the "Heroes Reborn" world, cosmic entities "O" and "K" kidnapped him, saying his presence has tipped the balance of power. Using a tiara hooked to a brainwasher device, his teammate Blink managed if not to restore his consciousness, to brainwash Proteus, forcing him to act like Morph, and access to only Morph's memories, functionally "bringing him again to life." With Proteus trapped and believing he is Morph, he remained an Exile to continue fixing damaged realities. Considering Morph's body does not burn out like other hosts, Morph's consciousness is still active beneath Proteus. Also, Proteus is immune to metal while in Morph's body, since wearing a metal tiara during the "Heroes Reborn" world did not kill him. However, concerns about some discrepancies in "Morph's" behavior forced his teammates to plan regular brainwashings with the same device, and, eventually, put him in stasis whenever his behavior would change again. However, that device was destroyed when Psylocke and Sabretooth fought so intensely that they shook the Crystal Palace, causing a bookcase to fall on Morph's head, shattering the device. With the device shattered, it was only a matter of time before Proteus would re-emerge.

During a confrontation where Proteus reawakened, he found himself lacking in power to defeat the adversary. About to be crushed, Proteus shouted aloud his desire to stay alive. In a vision, he saw a figure, almost identical to his own true, energy form, telling him to take its hand, and he would survive. Upon doing so, Proteus found himself full of even greater power, using it to defeat his god-like enemy. Afterward, it was revealed that this being was the personality and soul of the true Morph, having been in limbo, gaining strength within Proteus and his own body, who had before only been able to speak a few sentences through Proteus' control. Revealing to Proteus that he had the ability to eject him from his body, Morph gave Proteus the chance to work together and share his body and their powers, in order to do more good, something which Morph had discovered Proteus desired deep within him. Proteus accepted, and the two now work together harmoniously, better than either could be alone.

However, soon after, when the New Exiles became immersed within the Crystal Palace, Proteus was absorbed in Morph's place, freeing Morph once and for all.

Powers and abilities
Kevin Sydney is a mutant metamorph with the ability to alter his physical appearance and voice at will to resemble that of any person he chooses. His power could also transform the appearance of his costume as well, which was made of unstable molecules. Morph's mutation to shape-shift has also made it so that his body is a Play-Doh-like substance and he can reattach limbs after they have been severed. He has limited telepathic abilities, which (in the original timeline) were enhanced by Professor X. As a side effect, he also gained limited telekinetic abilities. Upon choosing to work together and share his body with the energy mutant Proteus, Morph's powers appear to be amplified, at least enough to defeat a self-proclaimed god. Whether the two have access to Proteus' reality changing abilities has yet to be determined.

He has also stated that his mutation gives him a high metabolism and makes him very hormonal. In Exiles #33 Sasquatch said she was never able to detect a scent on Morph and Sabretooth stated that while hunting Proteus in Morph's body, Morph stands out like a sore thumb in a crowd of "normal" people to Sabretooth's senses regardless of his form. It also appears he has the ability to fly as demonstrated in Exiles #27. Due to his shapeshifting ability he does not wear any actual clothing, and he takes joy in pointing this out.

Kevin Sydney is a skilled actor, and a highly trained and efficient organizer of subversive activities. He carried various advanced weaponry of alien Siri design belonging to Factor Three, including a ray gun carried in a holster at his side. Though Morph is a prankster who downplays his intelligence, he is deceptively smart. He has a Master's degree in computer engineering, which he earned at Xavier's Institute.

Other versions
Changeling is the character's codename in the contiguous Marvel Universe, Earth-616. However, the character's reinvention as Morph in the X-Men animated series raised his profile such that alternate versions of the character, now also named Morph, began to appear in stories set in other universes.

Age of Apocalypse
In the Age of Apocalypse (AoA), Morph was, like his "regular Marvel Universe" counterpart Changeling, an early recruit of the X-Men. Unlike Changeling, Kevin Sydney of AoA never died while impersonating Professor X, because in the Age of Apocalypse Xavier died before the X-Men were ever founded.

In the AoA timeline, Morph often agitated his teammates with his off-the-wall sense of humor and inappropriate timing; he describes himself as wanting to die with a smile on his face when his time comes. Despite his happy-go-lucky attitude, Morph has displayed signs of a softer, more empathetic side several times. For example, he morphed into Sabretooth in an effort to comfort Blink while she doubted her abilities, and he later gave Rogue the strength to endure against the horseman Holocaust by acting as her son. Shortly after the defeat of Apocalypse, he accompanied fellow X-Men Iceman, Wildchild and Exodus on an unspecified mission, during which they disappeared. Their fate has yet to be revealed, except for Wildchild, who has since joined a new team of Exiles.

The Lost Generation

A Morph is also seen as a member of First Line, set in Earth-616 but in the period after World War II.

In other media

 Kevin Sydney / Morph appears in X-Men: The Animated Series, voiced by Ron Rubin. This version is a member of the X-Men and close friend of Wolverine, who claims Morph is the only one who can make him laugh, before he is seemingly killed by Sentinels in the two-part pilot episode "Night of the Sentinels". During production of the series, Sydney was originally going to appear under his original codename of Changeling, but according to series producer and director Larry Houston, they changed his codename to Morph due to trademark issues with DC Comics' character Beast Boy, who also went by the name. In the second season, Morph was resurrected by Mister Sinister, implanted with control devices to brainwash him, driven progressively insane by memories of his apparent death, and developed two personalities: one who loved his teammates and one who hated them for abandoning him. The latter personality embarks on a guerilla war against the X-Men until he is confronted by Wolverine and forced to flee to Muir Island, where Wolverine learns what happened to Morph, who betrays Sinister and flees once more, unable to accept his former team's camaraderie. In the second season finale "Reunion (Part 2)", Morph attempts to help the X-Men defeat Sinister, but he reactivates Morph's implants and forces him to fight the X-Men until Professor X enters Morph's mind and reminds him of his original allegiances. Morph breaks free of Sinister's control and shatters him before Professor X removes the implants. Following this, Morph returns to Muir Island in the third season to recover from his mental instability. By the fourth season, he shows significant improvement, having received help from Moira MacTaggert, and rejoins the X-Men. Despite suffering from PTSD while fighting Sentinels, he would eventually overcome his trauma and defeat Master Mold, but leaves the X-Men due to concerns with his mental state and returns to MacTaggert's care, promising to return once he is ready. Following this, Morph would make cameo appearances in the episode "Beyond Good and Evil (Part 1)" as an attendee of Cyclops and Jean Grey's wedding and the series finale "Graduation Day" to assume Professor X's place while the real professor was dying from illness.
 The Exiles incarnation of Morph appears in Marvel Heroes, voiced by Tom Kenny.

References

External links
 Changeling at Marvel.com
 Kevin Sydney at Marvel Wolo
 UncannyXmen.net Character Profile on Changeling

Characters created by Roy Thomas
Comics characters introduced in 1967
Fictional actors
Fictional characters with dissociative identity disorder
Fictional pranksters
Fictional schoolteachers
Male characters in comics
Marvel Comics characters who are shapeshifters
Marvel Comics LGBT superheroes
Marvel Comics male superheroes
Marvel Comics mutants
Marvel Comics telepaths
X-Men members